The Chester Hill Rhinos were a rugby league team based in the suburb of Chester Hill in Sydney's south-west. From 2007 to 2009 the club fielded a side in the semi-professional NSWRL Jim Beam Cup competition in NSW, Australia. They folded in 2009. Their colours were blue, gold and white.

History
Chester Hill was admitted to the NSWRL Jim Beam Cup for the 2007 season and adopted the Rhino moniker for the side. They folded the team in 2009.

Notable Juniors
Notable First Grade Players that have played at Chester Hill Rhinos include:
Corey Payne (2005-12 St George Illawarra, Wests Tigers & Canterbury Bulldogs).

External links

Official website

Rugby league teams in Sydney
Rugby clubs established in 2007
2007 establishments in Australia
Chester Hill, New South Wales